Sir Leslie Matthew Ward (21 November 1851 – 15 May 1922) was a British portrait artist and caricaturist who over four decades painted 1,325 portraits which were regularly published by Vanity Fair, under the pseudonyms "Spy" and "Drawl". The portraits were produced as watercolours and turned into chromolithographs for publication in the magazine. These were then usually reproduced on better paper and sold as prints.  Such was his influence in the genre that all Vanity Fair caricatures are sometimes referred to as "Spy cartoons" regardless of who the artist actually was.

Early portraits, almost always full-length (judges at the bench being the main exception), had a stronger element of caricature and usually distorted the proportions of the body, with a very large head and upper body supported on much smaller lower parts.  Later, as he became more accepted by his social peers, and in order not to offend potential sitters, his style developed into what he called "characteristic portraits". This was less of a caricature and more of an actual portrait of the subject, using realistic body proportions.

Background

Ward was one of eight children of artists Edward Matthew Ward and Henrietta Ward, and the great-grandson of the artist James Ward. Although they had the same surname before marriage, Ward's parents were not related. Both were well-known history painters. His mother came from a line of painters and engravers: her father was the engraver and miniature painter George Raphael Ward; her grandfather the celebrated animal painter James Ward. She was niece of the portrait painter John Jackson and  great-niece of the painter George Morland. Both parents had studios in their homes in Slough and Kensington in London, where they regularly entertained the London artistic and literary elite. Ward's father was a gifted mimic who entertained Charles Dickens and other eminent guests. Although they never gave their son formal training, they and their artistic friends encouraged the young Ward to draw, paint, and sculpt.

Ward started caricaturing while still at school at Eton College, using his classmates and school masters as subjects. In 1867 his bust of his brother was exhibited at the Royal Academy in London. At school Ward had been an unexceptional student, and after he left Eton in 1869 his father encouraged him to train as an architect. Ward was too afraid to tell his father that he wanted to be an artist and he spent an unhappy year in the office of the architect Sydney Smirke, who was a family friend. The artist W. P. Frith spoke to Ward's father on his behalf, and after a great deal of arguing he finally agreed to support his son's training as an artist, and Ward entered the Royal Academy Schools in 1871. In 1873 he sent some of his work to Thomas Gibson Bowles, four years after Vanity Fair was founded. This led to him being hired to replace "Ape" (Carlo Pellegrini), who had temporarily left the magazine after falling out with Bowles. As his nom de crayon, Ward suggested to Bowles that he use the name "Spy", meaning "to observe secretly, or to discover at a distance or in concealment". Ward's Spy signature was similar to Pellegrini's stylised Ape.

Vanity Fair

Ward drew 1,325 cartoons for Vanity Fair between 1873 and 1911, many of which captured the personality of his subjects. His portraits of royalty, nobility, and women, however, were over-sympathetic, if not sycophantic. Later, as he became a member of Society himself, he became even more of a complimentary portraitist, moving from caricature to what he termed "characteristic portraits", a charge he acknowledged in his autobiography Forty Years of "Spy", published in 1915.

Ward worked methodically, often from memory, after observing his 'victims' at the racecourse, in the law courts, in church, in the academy lecture theatre, or in the lobby of the Houses of Parliament. Sometimes they came to his studio to pose in their robes or uniforms. A caricaturist, Ward believed, was born, not made. He observed, "A good memory, an eye for detail, and a mind to appreciate and grasp the whole atmosphere and peculiarity of the 'subject' are of course essentials." A caricature, he noted, should never depend on a physical defect, nor should it be forced. "If I could sum up the art in a sentence it would be that caricature should be a comic impression with a kindly touch, and always devoid of vulgarity."

In an 1897 interview given by Oliver Armstrong Fry (editor of Vanity Fair) to Frank Banfield of Cassell's Magazine, it was reported that Ward received between £300 and £400 per portrait. Ward was the most famous Vanity Fair artist; indeed, the whole genre of caricatures are often referred to as "Spy cartoons". He worked for Vanity Fair for over forty years, producing more than half of the 2,387 caricatures published.

Later years
Ward's clubs included the Arts, the Orleans, the Fielding, the Lotus, the Punch Bowl, and the Beefsteak, where he was one of the original members. There he sketched many of his victims. In 1899, years after her father had refused him permission to marry her, Ward married the society hostess Judith Mary Topham-Watney, the only daughter of Major Richard Topham of the 4th Queen's Own Hussars. They had one daughter, Sidney.

Ward's last cartoon for Vanity Fair appeared in June 1911 as he had recently begun to contribute his "characteristic portraits" to The World and Mayfair. He supplemented his income by painting portraits. In 1918 he was knighted. Ward prophesied that "when the history of the Victorian era comes to be written in true perspective, the most faithful mirror and record of representative men and spirit of their times will be sought and found in Vanity Fair". After a nervous breakdown Ward died suddenly of heart failure at 4 Dorset Square, Marylebone, London on 15 May 1922 and was buried on 18 May at Kensal Green Cemetery in London.

About 300 of his original watercolours for Vanity Fair are in the National Portrait Gallery, London.

Gallery

See also
Vanity Fair caricatures

References

Publications
Leslie Ward (1915), Forty Years of "Spy", London: Chatto and Windus.

External links

National Portrait Gallery – Index of "Spy" portraits
National Portrait Gallery – Index of portraits of Sir Leslie Ward
Sir Leslie Ward biography
Spy cartoons
 
 
 
  (Ward's biography)

British caricaturists
1851 births
1922 deaths
Knights Bachelor
People educated at Eton College
Burials at Kensal Green Cemetery
Vanity Fair (British magazine) artists
Royal Society of Portrait Painters
Artists' Rifles soldiers
British watercolourists
19th-century British painters
20th-century British painters
British male painters
19th-century British male artists
20th-century British male artists